Computer Braille is an adaptation of braille for precise representation of computer-related materials such as programs, program lines, computer commands, and filenames. Unlike standard 6-dot braille scripts, but like Gardner–Salinas braille codes, this may employ the extended 8-dot braille patterns. The resulting 256 braille characters are assigned to the 256 characters of 8-bit computer encodings.

There are two standards of representation of computer code with braille:

1) The Computer Braille Code as defined by the Braille Authority of North America. However, since January 2016 it is no longer official in the US and replaced by Unified English Braille (UEB). It employs only the 6-dot braille patterns to represent all code points of ASCII as well as many technical characters and commands. It is virtually identical to the Braille ASCII, a system of representation of braille with ASCII characters, which goal is mirrored to the Computer Braille Code. To represent ASCII code points 0x60, 0x7B, 0x7C, 0x7D, 0x7E as well as capital letters the 4-5-6 character is used as the shift indicator or modifier. In other words,  either adds (for punctuation) or subtracts (for letters) 32 to or from the ASCII value of the following character.

2) The Braille Computer Notation as defined by the Braille Authority of the United Kingdom. In this notation both 6- and 8-dot patterns may be used. With the 6-dot code various combinations of braille characters can represent many technical, mathematical and logical symbols. The   character is used as a universal modifier. The 8-dot code is designed that its 6-dot subset is identical to the 6-dot code. The remainder are assigned by the following rules:

 adding dot 7 subtracts 32 from the ASCII value; 
 adding dot 8 adds 128 to the ASCII value;
 adding dots 7 and 8 adds 96 to the ASCII value.

References 

Braille